Kavalerovsky District is an administrative and municipal district (raion), one of the twenty-two in Primorsky Krai, Russia. It is located in the central western portion of the krai and borders with the territory of Dalnegorsk Town Under Krai Jurisdiction in the north and northeast, the Sea of Japan in the east, Olginsky District in the south, and with Chuguyevsky District in the west. Its administrative center is the urban locality (an urban-type settlement) of Kavalerovo. Population:  The population of Kavalerovo accounts for 59.5% of the district's total population.

Geography
Forests cover 80% of the district's territory. Fauna is represented by such rare species as the Siberian tiger, snow leopard, deer, and the Amur wild cat.

History
The district was established on June 3, 1954 when it was split from Tetyukhinsky District.

Economy
Kavalerovsky District is one of the krai's main tin mining regions. There are also deposits of lead and zinc ores, brown coal, gold dust, and boric raw materials. A number of large enterprises are located in the district, such as the Khrustalnaya Mining Company which specializes in tin mining; JSC Apeks, which is a gold mining enterprise; and JSC Zenit, which specializes in brown coal mining. There are also forestry enterprises engaged in lumber cutting and sawtimber production. Agriculture is not well developed.

Tourism
The mountainous landscape, rich flora and fauna including pristine pine forests, fresh air, and pure water make this district attractive for tourism and recreation activities.

References

Notes

Sources

External links
Official website of Kavalerovsky District 
Unofficial website of Kavalerovsky District 

Districts of Primorsky Krai
States and territories established in 1954